The Kim languages are a small group of the Mbum–Day languages of the provisional Savanna family, spoken in southern Chad. There are three languages: 
Kim (Garap, Gerep, Kolop, Kosop), Besme, Goundo.
Goundo is nearly extinct, and Besme has only a thousand or so speakers.

The Kim languages were labeled "G14" in Joseph Greenberg's Adamawa language-family proposal.

See also
Kim word lists (Wiktionary)

References

  
Mbum–Day languages